Plays Well with Others is a box set by Phil Collins, released in 2018. The first three discs chronicle Collins' contributions to albums by various musicians, while the fourth disc features live performances.

Track listing

Disc one: 1969–1982

Disc two: 1982–1991

Disc three: 1991–2011

Disc four: Live 1981–2002

Charts

References 

2018 compilation albums
Phil Collins compilation albums